The Puerto Rican nesophontes (Nesophontes edithae), or Puerto Rican shrew, is an extinct eulipotyphlan endemic to Puerto Rico.

It is believed that the animal was never observed by Europeans. Contemporary fossils with indigenous artefacts and introduced rat fossils indicate survival into the colonial era, possibly until the 16th century. The shrew lived in the island montane forest/brush endemic to western Puerto Rico and was an insectivore. There are fossil specimens located in London. It disappeared after introduction of rats and due to the destruction of its forest habitat.

See also
List of extinct animals
List of endemic fauna of Puerto Rico

References

Nesophontes
Mammal extinctions since 1500
Extinct animals of the United States
Mammals of Puerto Rico
Endemic fauna of Puerto Rico
Mammals of the Caribbean
Mammals described in 1916